Landomycins are angucycline antibiotics isolated from Streptomyces.

References 
 

Antibiotics
Angucyclines